Lambertson is a surname. Notable people with the surname include:

David Floyd Lambertson (born 1940), former United States Ambassador to Thailand
William P. Lambertson (1880–1957), United States Representative from Kansas

English-language surnames